Thomas Robert Lavery (1852–1938) was an Irish Unionist (and later Northern Irish Unionist) politician. He worked as a director of a hemstitching company before his election as an Ulster Unionist Party member of Down County Council.

He served as Deputy Lieutenant of County Down.  At the 1921 Northern Ireland general election, he was elected in Down, and he held his seat, unopposed, at the 1925 general election. He stood down in 1929, due to illness, but was nonetheless elected the following year to the Senate of Northern Ireland, serving until his death in 1938.

References

1852 births
1938 deaths
Members of Down County Council
Members of the House of Commons of Northern Ireland 1921–1925
Members of the House of Commons of Northern Ireland 1925–1929
Members of the Senate of Northern Ireland 1929–1933
Members of the Senate of Northern Ireland 1933–1937
Ulster Unionist Party members of the House of Commons of Northern Ireland
Deputy Lieutenants of Down
Date of birth missing
Date of death missing
Place of birth missing
Place of death missing
Members of the House of Commons of Northern Ireland for County Down constituencies
Ulster Unionist Party members of the Senate of Northern Ireland
Ulster Unionist Party councillors